John Clapham may refer to:

 John Clapham (historian and poet) (1566–1619), English historian and poet
 John Greaves Clapham (1790s–1854), businessman and political figure in Lower Canada and Canada East
 John Peele Clapham (1801–1875), English solicitor and justice of the peace
 John Clapham (economic historian) (1873–1946), British economic historian